Challenge of the Yukon is an American radio adventure series that began on Detroit's WXYZ and is an example of a Northern genre story.  The series was first heard on January 3, 1939. The title changed from Challenge of the Yukon to Sergeant Preston of the Yukon in September 1950, and that title was retained through the end of the series and into a television adaptation.

Background
Following the success of The Lone Ranger and The Green Hornet on Detroit's WXYZ (now WXYT), the station owner, George W. Trendle, asked for a similar adventure show with a dog as the hero. According to WXYZ staffer Dick Osgood, in his history of the station, Trendle insisted that it not be "a dog like Lassie because... this must be an action story. It had to be a working dog." Writer Tom Dougall, who had been influenced by the poems of Robert W. Service, chose a Husky. The dog was originally called Mogo, but after criticism by Trendle, Dougall re-christened the canine King. Dougall likewise created Sgt. Preston and the French-Canadian guide. Fran Striker, who also wrote for The Lone Ranger, contributed show scripts.

However, Trendle's criticism of Dougall may have had another reason behind it.  Shortly before the two Trendle series aired (Lone Ranger and Challenge of the Yukon), popular author Zane Grey had a book in circulation (The Lone Star Ranger) about a Texas Ranger like the Lone Ranger and a comic book series in circulation (King of the Royal Mounted) about the adventures of Sgt. King, a Royal Canadian Mounted Policeman like Sgt. Preston. From 1922 a series of novels by Laurie York Erskine featuring Renfrew of the Royal Mounted warranted enough popularity to begin a radio series of the same title in 1936 and a film series beginning in 1937; the latter featuring a canine sidekick. 

Challenge of the Yukon began as a 15-minute serial, airing locally from 1938 until May 28, 1947. Shortly thereafter, the program acquired a sponsor, Quaker Oats, and the series, in a half-hour format, moved to the networks. The program aired on ABC from June 12, 1947, to December 30, 1949. It was then heard on The Mutual Broadcasting System from January 2, 1950, through the final broadcast on June 9, 1955. In September 1950, when the show moved to three broadcasts a week, the title was changed to Sergeant Preston of the Yukon.

Details
The program was an adventure series about Sergeant Frank Preston of the North-West Mounted Police and his lead sled dog, Yukon King, as they fought evildoers in the Northern wilderness during the Gold Rush of the 1890s.  The serial began on radio in 1938 and continued through 1947, after which the series moved to television.  The original television program ran from 1947 through 1949 on ABC and was sponsored by Quaker Oats.  In January 1951, the radio version was resurrected, running until 1955 , when the show moved once again to television as Sergeant Preston of the Yukon.  The show starred Richard Simmons.

The theme music was Emil von Reznicek's overture to Donna Diana, an old opera, though the overture remains a concert staple to this day. The show's episodes ended with the official pronouncement, "Well, King, this case is closed."

Sgt. Preston  
Preston, according to radio historian Jim Harmon, first joined the Royal Canadian Mounted Police to capture his father's killer, and when he was successful, he was promoted to sergeant. Preston worked under the command of Inspector Conrad, and in the early years was often assisted by a French-Canadian guide named Pierre.  During the course of the series, Preston successfully puts down a rebellion, and captures assassins.  Each episode has him battling a new crisis, whether it be tracking down a murderer, a gang of thieves, or claim jumping miners.

Yukon King 
Preston's side-kick and ally (and arguably the true star of the show), was the brave Alaskan husky, Yukon King.  Yukon King had a keen instinct for sensing criminals, and was equally valuable dealing with wild animals, once saving a small child from a wolverine.  In the radio version, King's barks were usually provided by animal imitators, usually sound effects artist Dewey Cole, and later, actor Ted Johnstone.  The radio series supplied King with a back story.  As radio historian Jim Harmon recalled, King had been a Husky puppy raised by a mother wolf.  When a lynx attacks the wolf and her cub, Sergeant Preston arrives in time to save King.  Preston then raised the animal as his own dog team captain.  On television, Yukon King was still a vital element, though the dog was now played by an Alaskan Malamute trained by Beverly Allen.  The dog received star billing right after Preston, and alongside his horse, Rex.  There is some confusion regarding King's actual breed. The writers seemed to use malamute and husky interchangeably.  At least once, Preston answered "malamute" to the question from another character. In one radio episode Preston indicates King's mother had been a wolf, which would make him a wolfdog.

Premise
Typical plots involved the pair helping injured trappers, tracking down smugglers, or saving cabin dwellers from wolverines.  Sergeant Preston's faithful steed was Rex, used primarily in the summer months, but generally Yukon King and his dog team were the key mode of transportation (as signaled by Preston's cry of "On, King! On, you huskies!)".  In the early radio shows, the cry of "On, you huskies!" would alternate with "On, you malamutes" from show to show.

Radio cast
Sgt. Preston – The part of Sgt. Preston was played by different actors over the course of the long run. Jay Michael, who had often played villain Butch Cavendish on The Lone Ranger, originated the role, and played the brave Mountie from 1939 through the mid-1940s. Former movie actor Paul Sutton took over the role, followed briefly by Brace Beemer when The Lone Ranger ended in 1954. Sutton took over again, however, by the time of the final broadcast.
Yukon King – The barks, whines, and howls of Yukon King were supplied by one of the station's sound effects men, Dewey Cole, and following Cole's death, by actor Ted Johnstone.
Narrator and supporting players – The original announcer/narrator was Bob Hite, also a narrator for The Lone Ranger, Green Hornet and The Shadow. Hite was replaced by former star Jay Michael when Sutton took over. Lone Ranger narrator Fred Foy also filled the role from time to time. John Todd was heard occasionally as Inspector Conrad, and Frank Russell played Pierre. Episodic performers came from the same talent pool as the other WXYZ shows.

Television series: Sergeant Preston of the Yukon

In 1955, the same year the radio show ended, Sergeant Preston of the Yukon premiered as a television series. Richard Simmons starred as Sgt. Preston, and was supported by Yukon King and Rex, now played by real animals. The dog cast as King was not a husky, however, but a large purebred Alaskan Malamute.  Charles Livingstone, who had worked on the radio version, directed several episodes. Some plot lines were re-used from the radio show, and stories original to the series were generally built upon the same themes. The same few buildings were regularly seen as part of many settlements in the shows. The additional visual component of the snowy Yukon, however, did give the television version a different feel but like all such films when filmed on a stage set, the frosty breath of people in Arctic conditions could not be simulated. Generally, however, there was an outdoor feel though a few times shadows on the skyline could be seen. Genuine outdoor scenes were added to give the show some reality though the viewer could not help but notice a sameness to them as they were all filmed in the same area and reused at times.

Mainly filmed at Ashcroft, Colorado, the series was telecast on CBS from September 29, 1955, to September 25, 1958. The first two seasons were produced by Trendle-Campbell-Meurer, and the show was broadcast in the same time slot as ABC's The Lone Ranger. In its last season, Sergeant Preston of the Yukon was purchased and produced by the Jack Wrather Corporation.

In 1955, the Quaker Oats company gave away land in the Klondike as part of the Klondike Big Inch Land Promotion which was tied in with the television show. Genuine deeds each to one square inch of a lot in Yukon Territory, issued by Klondike Big Inch Land Co. Inc., were inserted into Quaker's Puffed Wheat and Puffed Rice cereal boxes.

Timeless Media Group released a 2-disc best-of set featuring 10 episodes from the series on DVD in Region 1 on November 21, 2006.

Infinity Entertainment has released all 3 seasons of the series on DVD in Region 1.

Post TV 
After filming concluded, the dog, named King, went to live with the family of the president of Jack Wrather Productions after retirement.  Wrather had produced the Lassie and Lone Ranger television shows.  King eventually was housed on acreage belonging to Texas ex-governor William Carey Graves. King lived to an advanced old age well into the 1960s. He was a loving, obedient, long-discussed pet remembered with much affection.

There was also a board game, called Sgt. Preston, released by Milton Bradley in 1956.

Comic book series
From 1951 to 1958 Dell Comics published 29 issues of Sergeant Preston of the Yukon. The first four issues appeared biannually, then quarterly, in the weekly catch-all series Four Color Comics (#344, 373, 397, 419), then assumed its own numbering with issue #5, most often as a quarterly but also bimonthly.

All issues were written by Gaylord Du Bois (creator of Turok) and illustrated by Alberto Giolitti (best known as the longtime illustrator of Turok).

The Dell comic book covers were paintings portraying drama or action, featuring Yukon King and Sergeant Preston in exciting scenes. Once the Sergeant Preston of the Yukon television series premiered, the comic book featured photo covers of the TV series star in character as Sergeant Preston.

Radio episode guide

See also
Old-time radio

References

Sources
Dunning, John (1998). On the Air: The Encyclopedia of Old-Time Radio. New York: Oxford University Press. 
Harmon, Jim (1967). The Great Radio Heroes. New York: Doubleday and Company.
Ohmart, Ben (2002). It's That Time Again. Albany: BearManor Media.

External links

NPR: Daniel Pinkwater remembers Sergeant Preston of the Yukon and Yukon King (January 20, 2003)

American radio dramas
1939 radio programme debuts
1955 radio programme endings
Radio programs adapted into television shows
Radio programs adapted into comics
1930s American radio programs
1940s American radio programs
1950s American radio programs
Royal Canadian Mounted Police in fiction
Television shows set in Yukon
Yukon in fiction
Klondike Gold Rush in fiction
Dell Comics titles
ABC radio programs
Mutual Broadcasting System programs
Works about law enforcement in Canada
North-West Mounted Police